Fvlgvres (Latin: "fulgures", English: "you thunder") is the 2007 second Italian language album by Roman Empire-themed Italian progressive metal band Janvs. The title track "Fvlgvres" commences "Tuona, fra universi di tenebra Illumina ciò che in me Tenta di vincere il tempo", (English "You thunder, between universes of darkness, Illuminate what in me Attempts to triumph over time").

Track listing
"Fvlgvres" – 6:48
"Terzo Volto" – 6:06
"Pivme D'Arcangelo" – 6:16
"Vesper" – 8:34
"Melencolia" – 4:53
"Vrsa Major" – 5:59
"Addii" – 2:59

Personnel
Matteo "Vinctor" Barelli – vocals, guitar, keyboards, programming
Claudio "Malphas" Fogliato – bass
Francesco La Rosa – drums, keyboards, samples

References

2007 albums
Janvs albums
Concept albums